The PURE Insurance Championship is a golf tournament on the PGA Tour Champions. It is sponsored by the PURE Insurance company and normally held in August/September in Monterey, California at the Pebble Beach Golf Links and Del Monte Golf Course, but has also been played in July. In 2014 it was played at Pebble Beach and Poppy Hills Golf Course.

It is an official PGA Tour Champions event that pairs one junior with one senior, PGA Tour Champions player and two amateurs. Seventy-eight junior spots are awarded, seventy chosen from two selection processes and eight exemptions are selected through The First Tee of Monterey County and Monterey Peninsula Foundation, the host organization.

The purse for the 2012 tournament was US$1,800,000, with $255,000 going to the winner. The tournament was founded in 2004 as The First Tee Open at Pebble Beach presented by Wal-Mart. The First Tee of Monterey County is one of the direct receivers of the proceeds made from this tournament. Walmart was the title sponsor of this event from 2004 to 2009. National Association for Home Care & Hospice was the title sponsor for 2010. Nature Valley was the title sponsor for the 2011 tournament.

Winners

Multiple winners
Two players have won this tournament more than once through 2022.

3 wins
Jeff Sluman: 2008, 2009, 2011
Kirk Triplett: 2012, 2013, 2019

Pebble Beach Double
Two players have won this tournament and the PGA Tour tournament (AT&T Pebble Beach National Pro-Am) held at Pebble Beach in their careers.

References

External links
Official website
Coverage on the PGA Tour Champions official site
The First Tee official website

PGA Tour Champions events
Golf in California
Sports in Monterey County, California
Recurring sporting events established in 2004
2004 establishments in California